Pierre Goldman (Lyon, 22 June 1944 – Paris, 20 September 1979) was a French left-wing intellectual who was convicted of several robberies and mysteriously assassinated. It has been suspected that the Grupos Antiterroristas de Liberación (GAL) death squad was involved in his murder. His half-brother Jean-Jacques Goldman is a popular French singer.

Biography 
Pierre Goldman was born near the end of World War II, the son of Alter Mojze Goldman and Janine Sochaczewska, who were active in the FTP-MOI Resistance movement. After the liberation of France, his parents separated, and his father, in concert with a group of former FTP-MOI members, kidnapped him. At that time, Alter said that he took Pierre so that he would not grow up in the country that had seen the elimination of so many Jews. Thereafter, he had only sporadic contact with his mother, who returned to Poland.

Though he was expelled from various high schools and boarding schools, Goldman obtained his baccalauréat and pursued courses at the Sorbonne as an independent auditor. He joined the Union of Communist Students in 1963. In 1966, he refused to do his compulsory military service, and travelled to Cuba instead, where he heard Fidel Castro speak at the Tricontinental Conference in January 1966. Still in Havana for the funerary eve after Che Guevara's death, he met through intermediary Régis Debray, a number of Venezuelan guerrilleros.

Returning to Paris, he remained distant from May '68 activism. In June 1968 he returned to Venezuela and spent a year there in guerrilla activities. On 11 June 1969, after the attack of an arms depot his group withdrew in the sierra, and then lost all support from Cuba which rallied with the Venezuelan government's side. Goldman then robbed the Royal Bank of Canada in Puerto La Cruz on 11 June 1969, taking 2.6 million bolívars (the biggest hold-up of that year), a robbery later claimed by the FALN guerrilla. Of his comrades, only Goldman was not identified, fleeing in September to Paris.

Having quickly spent his remaining money, he staged several robberies of small businesses in December 1969 and January 1970. During this period, he reportedly considered kidnapping writer Jean-Edern Hallier, whom he profoundly disliked. In 1974, he was given a life-sentence by the Paris cour d'assises after being convicted of a bloody robbery on 19 December 1969 on the Boulevard Richard-Lenoir, in which two pharmacists were killed. He denied having committed the robbery, although he admitted having conducted three earlier robberies. He was sentenced to 12 years in prison for the other three robberies and given a life sentence for the December 1969 assassination.

During the five years he spent in prison, he studied philosophy and Spanish, and wrote a book on his own case, Souvenirs obscurs d'un juif polonais né en France (Obscure Memories of a Polish Jew Born in France), published in 1975. The impact of the book on some French intellectuals and personalities, including the actress Simone Signoret, the writer Françoise Sagan, Jean-Paul Sartre and Régis Debray, among others, plus many inconsistencies recorded during the investigation led to a second trial, which started on 26 April 1976. He was acquitted and freed in October 1976. Afterward, he contributed to left-wing newspapers, joining the Temps Modernes and Libération.

Assassination 
On 20 September 1979, he was assassinated at point-blank range in Paris. Eyewitnesses described seeing three Spanish-looking persons. The police first suspected the Mafia; however, the murder was claimed by (according to AFP) an unknown far-right group: Honneur de la police (Honour of the Police). Pierre Goldman's funeral was attended by 15,000 people. A few hours after his death, his wife Christiane gave birth to a son, Manuel.

The perpetrators of Pierre Goldman's murder have not been found. Various theories persist, the most serious one pointing to Marseilles' criminal underground, which might have assassinated him on behalf of the GAL ( Grupos Antiterroristas de Liberación), a death squad set up by Spanish officials to fight ETA in the 1980s. Pierre Goldman was allegedly helping ETA procure weapons, and planned to create an organization to fight the GAL. Another theory shared by VSD points toward the French intelligence services — supported by the fact that former police officer Lucien Aimé-Blanc, in charge of the Narcotics Department, pointed to the presence of a SDECE officer in the scene.

In April 2006 Libération published an interview of said former police officer, who stated that one of his informants, Jean-Pierre Maïone, had admitted a few years later of having killed Goldman on behalf of the GAL:

Identity of the Assassin 
On 22 May 2012, a blog post from lemonde.fr identified the killer of Pierre Goldman as René Resciniti de Says. A former paratrooper for the French Armed Forces, Resciniti de Says was known as René l'élégant and died on 17 April 2012 at the age of 61. Goldman's assassin had previously been identified under the pseudonym Gustavo by documentarian Michel Despratx in 2010. Extreme right journalist, Emmanuel Ratier, in the bimonthly newsletter Faits et Documents, claims the true identity of Gustavo to have been René Resciniti de Says. The blog post alleges that René Resciniti de Says was an associate of French monarchist group Action Française as well as being one of Bob Denard's mercenaries. Gustavo, the 2010 Michel Despratx documentary which was broadcast by Canal+, claims to have assassinated Goldman as part of a four-person commando squad which included an inspector of the Direction de la surveillance du territoire (DST) and a police officer of the Direction centrale des renseignements généraux (RG). Nevertheless, as pointed out by the blog post, Gustavo'''s testimony and his identification as René Resciniti de Says remain to be corroborated.

 Bibliography 
 Souvenirs obscurs d'un juif polonais né en France, Le Seuil, 1975.
 L'ordinaire mésaventure d'Archibald Rapoport (1977)

Books about him:
 La vie rêvée de Pierre Goldman by Antoine Casubolo (2005)
 Pierre Goldman, le frère de l'ombre by Michaël Prazan, (2005)
 , Amnassar (2005)

 References 

 External links 
The Pierre Goldman Affair at marxists.org
  June 9, 2005 Nouvel Observateur'' article on Michaël Prazan's book
 About Pierre Goldman (on Jean-Jacques Goldman's website)
   May 22, 2012 LeMonde.fr blog article reporting on "'Gustavo' the man who said he killed Pierre Goldman".

1944 births
1979 deaths
Writers from Lyon
Burials at Père Lachaise Cemetery
French communists
20th-century French criminals
20th-century French Jews
Jewish socialists
French people of Polish-Jewish descent
Assassinated French people
Assassinated Jews
Deaths by firearm in France
People murdered in Paris
Terrorism deaths in France
1979 murders in France
1970s murders in Paris